Polyglypta is a genus of treehoppers in the family Membracidae. There are at least three described species in Polyglypta.

Species
These three species belong to the genus Polyglypta:
 Polyglypta costata Burmeister c g
 Polyglypta dorsalis Burmeister c g b
 Polyglypta lineata Burmeister c g
Data sources: i = ITIS, c = Catalogue of Life, g = GBIF, b = Bugguide.net

References

Further reading

External links

 

Smiliinae
Auchenorrhyncha genera